Waah Zindagi  is a 2021 Hindi-language comedy drama film starring Naveen Kasturia, Plabita Borthakur,  Vijay Raaz, Sanjay Mishra, Ramnath Choudhary , Dharmesh Vyas, Manoj Joshi, Lalit Sharma and Nakul Tiwadi. The film is based on the concept of 'Make in India'. The film premiered on 31 December 2021 on ZEE5.

Plot 
Besides a quirky and unconventional love story, Waah Zindagi is a journey of a destitute farmer's son struggling hard to become an entrepreneur to win his childhood sweet heart. His achievements are ravaged into failures by the mass dumping of Chinese products in the Indian Markets ruining all the Indian industries and businesses including his own. Devastated and dejected in love he gathers courage to fight and stand against China to redeem his love ending up in the Make In India initiative.

Cast 
Naveen Kasturia as Ashok
Plabita Borthakur as Reena 
Vijay Raaz as Banna
 Sanjay Mishra as Grandfather Ramkaran
Ramnath Choudhary As Algoja Player with Nose
Manoj Joshi as Jagat Shah
Teetu Verma as Nanku naai
Dharmesh Vyas as Sajjan Singh
Lalit Sharma as Rajesh
Nakul Tiwadi as Desai

Filming 
The filming was on location in Morbi village in Gujarat rural Rajasthan, rural part of Madhyapradesh and rural part of maharashtra as well.

Soundtrack 

The film's music was composed by Parag Chhabra, while lyrics were written by Manoj Yadav and Shellee.

Release 
Initially projected to release in March 2019 by the filmmakers, the film is set to be released on over-the-top media services.

References

External links
 Waah Zindagi at ZEE5
 

Indian romantic comedy films
ZEE5 original films